The wushu competitions at the 2017 Southeast Asian Games in Kuala Lumpur were held at Kuala Lumpur Convention Centre.

The 2017 Games feature competitions in 17 events, 8 for men and 9 for women.

Medalists

Men

Women

Medal table

References

External links
  

2017
Southeast Asian Games
2017 Southeast Asian Games events